Poly(rC)-binding protein 3 is a protein that in humans is encoded by the PCBP3 gene.

This gene encodes a member of the KH domain protein subfamily. Proteins of this subfamily, also referred to as alpha-CPs, bind to RNA with a specificity for C-rich pyrimidine regions. Alpha-CPs play important roles in post-transcriptional activities and have different cellular distributions. This gene's protein is found in the cytoplasm, yet it lacks the nuclear localization signals found in other subfamily members. Multiple polyadenylation sites exist for this gene.

References

Further reading